Jazz Information was an American non-commercial weekly jazz publication founded as a record collector's sheet in 1939 by Eugene Williams (1918–1948), Ralph Gleason, Ralph de Toledano, and Jean Rayburn (maiden name; 1918–2009), who married Ralph Gleason in 1940.

History 
The first issue, dated September 8, 1939, was a four-page newsletter that was mimeographed late one night in the back room of the Commodore Music Shop in Manhattan at 46 West 52nd Street. In July 1940, Jazz Information, went from a newsletter to a little magazine format, hip pocket in size with modest typesetting. George Hoefer, Jr. (1909–1967), began the "Safety Valve" column on collecting, collectors, and how collectors annoyed musicians. The publication ran sporadically until November 1941.

Editorial bent 
Stephen W Smith, editor of the Hot Record Society Rag, leaned towards what then was progressive jazz.  Eugene Williams, through Jazz Information, leaned towards a New Orleans revivalists bent.

Record label 
Jazz Information was a record label distributed by Commodore Records that produced recordings of Bunk Johnson in 1942. Bill Russell, while gathering material for Jazzmen in 1938, discovered long forgotten New Orleans trumpeter Bunk Johnson on a farm in New Iberia, Louisiana. In 1942, Russell helped get Johnson a new set of teeth and a new trumpet. And, with Eugene Williams, editor if Jazz Information in New York; and Dave Stuart (né David Ashford Stuart; 1910–1984), owner of the Jazz Man Record Shop in Hollywood, traveled to New Orleans and made the first recordings of Bunk Johnson.

Selected articles 
 "Zue Robertson: King of the Trombone" (Zue Robertson), by William Russell  1 (1940): 3
 "Omer Simeon" (Omer Simeon), by Herman Rosenberg & Eugene Williams, Vol. 2, No. 1, July 26, 1940, pps. 8–9
 "William Russell" (Bill Russell), by Ed Nylund, Vol. 2, No. 2, August 9, 1940, pps. 15–16 (earliest known published biography of William Russell)
 "Ma Rainey Discography," (Ma Rainey), by William C. Love, Vol. 2, September 6, 1940, pps. 9–14 (discography) (Love was founder of the International Association of Jazz Record Collectors)
 "Jimmie Noone" (Jimmie Noone), by Wesley Miles Neff (1913–1996) of Chicago, Vol 2, October 4, 1940, pps. 6–9, 45
 "Cow Cow Davenport" (Charles Edward Davenport), by Donald Haynes, Vol. 2, October 25, 1940, pps. 8–10
 "Barney Bigard" (Barney Bigard), by George Hoefer, Jr. (1909–1967), Vol. 2, November 8, 1940, pps. 7–13 (extensive article plus discography; Hoefer later was associate editor of Jazz & Pop)
 "Little Mitch" (George Mitchell), by Wesley Miles Neff (1913–1996), Vol. 2, No. 16, November 1941, pps. 31–32
 "A History of Jazz Information" (transcript), by Eugene Williams, Vol. 2, November 1941, pps. 93–101

 New Orleans Clarinet series
 "New Orleans Clarinets: 2 – Edmond Hall" (Edmond Hall), by Herman Rosenberg & Eugene Williams, Vol. 2, No. 2, August 9, 1940
 "New Orleans Clarinets: 7 – Sidney Bechet" (Sidney Bechet), by Mary Evelyn Karoley (née Mary Frances Mellon; 1908–1993), Vol. 2, No. 8, December 6, 1940

 Possible related articles
 Jazzways, George Sigmund Rosenthal (1922–1967) & Frank Zachary (né Frank Zaharija; 1914–2015) (eds.) (© 21 January 1946; Jazzways, Cincinnati) (more than 100 photos by Skippy Adelman, Bernice Abbott, and Sargent John Marsh; 1916–2003)
  New York: Greenberg (1946, 1947); 
 (Greenberg, Publisher, founded in 1924 by Jacob Walter Greenberg; 1894–1974; & David Benjamin Greenberg; 1892–1968; sold to Chilton Book Company in 1958)
 Contributors
 Vol. 1
 "Report From Abroad," by Albert McCarthy
 "Jazz begins," by Rudi Blesh
 "Three Horns, Four Rhythm," by Dale Curran
 "Going Down State Street," by Frederic Ramsey, Jr.
 "Portrait of a Jazzman," Art Hodes
 "Benny Goodman," by Alexander King
 "Swing," by Frank Stacy, p. 49
 "Lionel Hampton, by Peter Fischer
 "New Orleans Today," by Eugene Williams & Julius "Skippy" Adelman (photographer) (note: Adelman, who later gave up photography, is still considered among the finest jazz photographers)
 "Discollecting," by Frederic Ramsey, Jr.
 Vol. 2
 "Jazz begins," by Rudi Blesh
 "Old Photographs"
 "Going Down State Street,"  by Frederic Ramsey, Jr.
 "Condon Mob"
 "Hot Royalty"
 "Benny Goodman," by Alexander King
 "Lionel Hampton, by Peter Fischer
 "Swing," by Frank Stacy (Stacy was, in the early 1940s, the New York editor for Down Beat)
 "New Orleans Today," by Eugene Williams & Julius "Skippy" Adelman (born around 1924) (photographer) (note: Adelman, who later gave up photography, is still considered among the finest jazz photographers) Philadelphia jazz journalist Nels Nelson wrote in 1985 that Adelman was among the greatest jazz photographers in the world.  In 1990, Nelson wrote that renowned jazz photographer "[Bill] Gottlieb ranks second only to the elusive Skippy Adelman in his capacity for capturing the moment."
 "Discollecting," by Frederic Ramsey, Jr.
 "Collector's Items"
 "One for the Money"
 "Two for the Show"
 "Concerto for Woody"
 "Portrait of a Jazzman," by Art Hodes (Hodes launched The Jazz Record in February 1943, which ran for 60 issues that ended November 1947)
 "Three Brass, Four Rhythm," by Dale Curran, p. 24

Selected discography 
 Artists re-issued by Jazz Information

 Freddie Keppard (Paramount)
 Ollie Powers (Claxtonola)
 Leola B. Wilson (Paramount)
 Trixie Smith (Paramount)
 Red Onion Jazz Babies (Gennett)
 Bunk Johnson (Purist)
 
 Bunny Berigan (unissued, Vocalion, Columbia)
 Frank Froeba (unissued, Vocalion)
 Don Albert (Vocalion)
 Boots and His Buddies (Bluebird)
 Carolina Cotton Pickers (Vocalion)
 Ernie Fields (Vocalion)
 Louis Armstrong (Storyville)
 Joe Newman (Metronome)
 Gerry Mulligan (Ingo)

 Artists produced by Jazz Information
 Bunk Johnson

Personnel

Magazine staff 
 1939–1941: Eugene Williams, publisher, graduated from Columbia College in 1939
 1939–1940: Ralph Gleason, associate editor, co-founded Rolling Stone in 1967
 Ralph de Toledano
 Herman Rosenberg
 George Hoefer (né Elmer George Hoefer, Jr.; 1909–1967) – born in Laramie, raised in Chapel Hill with a bachelor of science degree in civil engineering from UNC Chapel Hill – Hoefer went on to become a prolific jazz historian.  From 1959 to 1961, he was the New York editor for Down Beat for which he had a column, "The Hot Box."

Magazine tag line 
 "The weekly magazine," September 19, 1939, to June 14, 1940

Library access 
 
 
 
 

Re-publications
 
  (microfilm)

Online transcriptions, current and archived 

<li> 

 Archived via Wayback Machine
<li> 

<li> 

<li> 

<li> 

<li> 

<li> 

<li> 

<li> 

<li> 

<li> 

<li> 

<li> 

<li> 

<li> 

<li> 

<li> 

<li> 

<li> 

<li> 

<li> 

<li> (transcript incorrectly identifies this as Vol. 21)

<li> 

<li> 

<li> (transcript incorrectly identifies this as January 12, 1939, Vol. I, No. 21)

Bibliography

Annotations

Notes

Books, journals, magazines, and papers 

  .

  Retrieved May 18, 2019 – via Internet Archive ; .
<li> 
<li> 

  ; ; .

  ; ;  (paperback); .

 

  .

  ; ; .

   (publication);  (article);  (article).
 Retrieved May 18, 2019 – via  – jazz forum site that was active for 16 years, through January 2019, registered to and maintained by Jesse Miner, a San Francisco area chef and jazz history enthusiast. The forum boards were closed in January 2019, but much of its content, as of May 2022, is accessible. The 23 links to transcripts of Jazz Information on a former website of the late Joseph Elbert Shepherd (1926–2021) of Sterling, Virginia (https://www.swingdjs.com/viewtopic.php?t=1488), have been archived by Wayback Machine.

News media 

    (US Newsstream database).
   (US Newsstream database).

1939 establishments in the United States
Classical music record labels
Jazz record labels
New Jersey record labels
Mail-order retailers
Defunct record labels of the United States